The 2021–22 Women's Belgian Hockey League was the 96th season of the Women's Belgian Hockey League, the top women's Belgian field hockey league.

The season started on 5 September 2021 and concluded on 8 May 2022 with the second match of the championship final. Gantoise are the defending champions.

Changes from 2020–21
This season will again be played with 12 instead of 14 teams. Each team will play each other twice and the top four teams will advance to the championship play-offs. The bottom two teams will be relegated directly and the team in 10th place will play a relegation play-off against the third placed team in the second division.

Teams

Number of teams by provinces

Regular season

Standings

Results

Play–offs

Bracket

Semi-finals

Gantoise won the series 1–0.

Dragons won the series 1–0.

Third and fourth place

Final

Gantoise won the series 2–0.

Top goalscorers

References

Belgian Hockey League
Hockey League
Hockey League